Fiksdal or Fiksdalen is a village in Vestnes Municipality in Møre og Romsdal county, Norway. Fiksdal Church is located in this village. Fiksdal is also the hometown of Norwegian international footballer Kjetil Rekdal.

Media gallery

References

Villages in Møre og Romsdal
Vestnes